Woolwich (Royal Arsenal) Pier, also known as the Royal Arsenal Pier, Woolwich, is a pier on the River Thames, at Woolwich in the Royal Borough of Greenwich, England. Designed by Beckett Rankine and built by Mowlem in 2002, the pier is operated by London River Services.

Service
Woolwich (Royal Arsenal) Pier is served by Thames Clippers RB1 and RB5 services.

It is adjacent to the Royal Arsenal residential development.

Connections
Woolwich Station  from 24 May 2022
Woolwich Arsenal station  
River crossings to North Woolwich
Woolwich Free Ferry
Woolwich foot tunnel located next to the pier

Nearby places
Plumstead
Thamesmead
London City Airport

References

External links
Woolwich Arsenal Pier - Transport for London
Woolwich (Royal Arsenal) Pier - Uber Boat by Thames Clippers

Lines

Buildings and structures in the Royal Borough of Greenwich
London River Services
Piers in London
Transport in the Royal Borough of Greenwich
Woolwich